The Calumet is a historic commercial building located at Buffalo in Erie County, New York. It was designed in 1906, and is a three-story steel framed building covered in decorative architectural terra cotta. The distinctive glazed white and burnt sienna terra cotta is detailed with a centrally located reed or running stem and four leaves depicting the Calamus palm.

It was listed on the National Register of Historic Places in 2010.

References

External links
Buffalo as an Architectural Museum: The Calumet

Commercial buildings on the National Register of Historic Places in New York (state)
Commercial buildings completed in 1906
Buildings and structures in Buffalo, New York
Art Nouveau architecture in New York (state)
National Register of Historic Places in Buffalo, New York
1906 establishments in New York (state)